I Love You, I Love U, or I Luv U may refer to:

Film and television

Films 
 I Love You (1918 film), a silent drama written by Catherine Carr
 I Love You (1925 film), a German silent drama film
 I Love You (1938 film) a German drama film directed by Herbert Selpin
 I Love You (1979 Kannada film), a film starring Shankar Nag
 I Love You (1979 Telugu film), a Tollywood film directed by Vayunandana Rao
 I Love You (1981 film), a Brazilian drama directed by Arnaldo Jabor
 I Love You (1982 film), a Pakistani Urdu film starring Waheed Murad
 I Love You (1986 film), a French-Italian drama directed by Marco Ferreri
 I Love You (1992 film), an Indian Hindi-language film directed by Vara Prasad
 I Love You, a 2001 South Korean film starring Oh Ji-ho
 I Love You (2002 film), a Chinese drama directed by Zhang Yuan
 I Love You (2004 film), an Odia film directed by Hara Patnaik
 I Love You (2005 Croatian film), a Croatian film directed by Dalibor Matanić
 I Love You (2007 Bengali film), a Bengali film directed by Ravi Kinagi
 I Love You (2007 Mozambican film), a short film made for UNESCO and directed by Rogério Manjate
 I Love You (2012 film), a Bangladeshi film directed by Mushfiqur Rahman Gulzar
 I Love You (2019 film), a Kannada film directed by R. Chandru

Television 
 I Love You, a 2010 TV comedy special by Jake Johannsen
 "I Love You" (The Good Doctor), a 2020 episode

Music
 I Love You (Yah Tibyah La Blu), an American rock band

Albums
 I Love You (Aaradhna album), 2006
 I Love You (Amanda Blank album), 2009
 I Love You (Desireless album), 1994
 I Love You (Diana Ross album), 2006
 I Love You (Elek Bacsik album), 1975
 I Love You (Megumi Nakajima album), 2010
 I Love You (The Neighbourhood album), 2013
 I Love You (Stephanie Nakasian album), 2006
 I Love U (Mr. Children album), 2005
 I Love You (A Dedication to My Fans), a 2011 mixtape by Jadakiss
 I Love You, a 1999 album by Imants Kalniņš
 I Love You, a 1968 album by People!, or the title song, a cover of The Zombies' song (see below)
 I Love You, a 1994 album by T.Love
 I Love You, a 2010 album by Willie Revillame
 I Love You (EP), a 2013 EP by Said the Whale

Songs 
 "I Love You" (2NE1 song), 2012
 "I Love You" (Axwell & Ingrosso song), 2017
 "I Love You" (Billie Eilish song), 2019
 "I Love You" (Cliff Richard song), 1960
 "I Love You" (Climax Blues Band song), 1981
 "I Love You" (Cole Porter song), 1944
 "I Love You" (Donna Summer song), 1977
 "I Love You" (EXID song), 2018
 "I Love You" (Faith Evans song), 2002
 "I Love You" (Martina McBride song), 1999
 "I Love You" (Mary J. Blige song), 1995, not to be confused with "I Love U (Yes I Du)" (see below)
 "I Love You" (Otis Leavill song), 1969
 "I Love You" (Taeyeon song), 2010
 "I Love You" (Tone Damli song), 2010
 "I Love You" (Vanilla Ice song), 1990
 "I Love You" (Vasyl Lazarovich song), 2010
 "I Love You" (Woodkid song), 2013
 "I Love You" (Yello song), 1983
 "I Love You" (The Zombies song), 1965
 "I Love You (Miss Robot)", a 1980 song by The Buggles
 "I Love You (What Can I Say)", a 1978 song by Jerry Reed
 "(I Love You) For Sentimental Reasons", a 1945 popular song
 "Ily (I Love You Baby)", Surf Mesa song, 2019
 "I Love U" (The Chainsmokers song), 2022
 "I Love U" (Tila Tequila song), 2007
 "I Luv U" (Dizzee Rascal song), 2003
 "I Luv U" (The Ordinary Boys song), 2007
 "I Love You", by Amy Grant from Unguarded
 "I Love You", by Avril Lavigne from Goodbye Lullaby
 "I Love You", by Black Flag from My War
 "I Love You", by Celine Dion from Falling into You, also recorded by Faith Hill on Faith
 "I Love You", by Charice from Charice
 "I Love You", by Cheri Dennis from In and Out of Love
 "I Love You", by The Dandy Warhols from ...The Dandy Warhols Come Down
 "I Love You", by Dave Wang
 "I Love You", by Debbie Gibson, originally recorded by Yutaka Ozaki
 "I Love You", by Dru Hill from Dru World Order
 "I Love You", by Esser
 "I Love You", by G. Love and Special Sauce from G. Love and Special Sauce
 "I Love You", by the Heartbreakers from L.A.M.F.
 "I Love You", by Jim Reeves with Ginny Wright
 "I Love You", by Little Mix from Get Weird
 "I Love You", by Labi Siffre from his self-titled debut album
 "I Love You", by Sabrina from A Flower's Broken
 "I Love You", by Saigon Kick from Water
 "I Love You", by Sarah McLachlan from Surfacing
"I Love You", by Savage, the stage name of Italian musician Roberto Zanetti
 "I Love You", by Shinhwa from Winter Story
 "I Love You", by Steve Miller Band from Number 5
 "I Love You", by The Volumes
 "I Love You", written by Robert Wright and George Forrest from the operetta Song of Norway
 "I Love You", theme song for the television program Barney & Friends
 "I Love You (Prelude to Tragedy)", by HIM from Razorblade Romance
 "I Love U", by Chris Brown from Graffiti
 "I Love U (Yes I Du)", a song by Mary J. Blige from Stronger with Each Tear
 "I Love U (You Know I Don't)", a song by The Frogs from My Daughter the Broad
 "The I Love You Song" from the Broadway Musical The 25th Annual Putnam County Spelling Bee

Other uses
 ILY sign, an informal expression in American Sign Language signifying love or esteem
 I Love You (comics), a 1955–1980 romance comic published by Charlton
 ILOVEYOU, a computer worm that appeared in May 2000

See also
 
 
 Because I Love You (disambiguation)
 I Don't Love You (disambiguation)
 I Love Me (disambiguation)
 I Love You Too (disambiguation)
 I Loved You (disambiguation)
 I Will Always Love You (disambiguation)
 Je t'aime (disambiguation)
 Love (disambiguation)
 Love You (disambiguation)
 Te Amo (disambiguation)